Monosapyga is a genus of insects belonging to the family Sapygidae.

The species of this genus are found in Europe.

Species:
 Monosapyga clavicornis (Linnaeus, 1758)

References

Hymenoptera
Hymenoptera genera